'Films set in a country' differ from 'films shot in a country' and a 'film's nationality'. In films set in a country, the story depicts the characters/action situated/located in a said country. While in some films the action is set in multiple countries, in others it is set in one specific country. Some films that are set in a country may not necessarily be shot in that country and/or are not produced from that country. This is a list of films set in Ireland, meaning the films in this list depict their characters as being located in Ireland. While the majority of the films listed are Irish films, others are not, such as Hungry Hill (1947) (British), The Black Sheep (1960) (German), The Craic (1999) (Australian), and Hellboy II: The Golden Army (2008) (United States). The same applies with, while the majority of films were shot in Ireland, others were not, such as The Naked Truth (1957) (Irish scene filmed at Pinewood Studios in the United Kingdom), The Long Good Friday (1980), (scene in pub at start of film shot in United Kingdom), The Brylcreem Boys (1998) and  Waking Ned (1998) (both filmed entirely on the Isle of Man), and The Boondock Saints II: All Saints Day (2009) (filmed entirely in Canada, including Irish portion). The list is categorised into sections consisting of Feature Films, Short Films, Documentary Films and Mini-Series set in Ireland, and the films are listed alphabetically. There is also a section of a short list of films shot, but not set in Ireland listed at the bottom. These lists are not exhaustive.

Feature films

Numbers

 32A (2007)
 '71 (2014)

A

 The Abduction Club (2002)
 About Adam (2000)
 Accelerator (1999)
 The Actors (2003) 
 Adam & Paul (2004)
 Agnes Browne (1999)
 Ailsa (1994)
 Alarm (2008)
 Albert Nobbs (2011)
 Alive and Kicking (1959)
 Among the Irish Fisher Folk (1911)
 An Bronntanas (The Gift) (2014)
 And No One Could Save Her (1973)
 Angel (1982) - also called Danny Boy
 Angela's Ashes (1999)
 Anne Devlin (1984)
 Another Shore (1948)
 Anton (2008) 
 Arracht (2019)
 Arrah-na-Pogue (1911)
 Ascendancy (1982)
 Attracta (1983)

B

 Bad Day For The Cut (2017)
 The Ballroom of Romance (1982)
 Banshee Blacktop, An Irish Ghost Story (2016)
 Barry Lyndon (1975)
 Battle of the Bone (2008)
 A Belfast Story (2013)
 Beloved Enemy (1936)
 Between the Canals (2010)
 Bipedality (2010)
 Black 47 (2018)
 The Black Sheep (1960)
 The Bloodsucker Leads the Dance (1975)
 Bloody Sunday (2002)
 Bloom (2003)
 Bogwoman (1997)
 The Boondock Saints II: All Saints Day (2009)
 Borstal Boy (2000)
 Boxed (2002)
 The Boxer (1997)
 Boy Eats Girl (2005)
 The Boy from Mercury (1996)
 The Boys from County Clare (2003) - also called The Boys and Girl from County Clare (US) and The Great Ceili War (UK)
 Breakfast on Pluto (2005)
 Broken Law (2020)
 Brooklyn (2015)
 Broth of a Boy (1959)
 The Brylcreem Boys (1998) - set in Ireland, filmed on the Isle of Man
 The Butcher Boy (1997)

C

 Cal (1984)
 Calvary (2014)
 The Canal (2014)
 Captain Boycott (1947)
 Captain Lightfoot (1955)
 Cardboard Gangsters (2017)
 Casey's Millions (1922)
 Catholics (1973) - also Called Conflict, A Fable of the Future and The Visitor
 Chasing Leprechauns (2012)
 Cherrybomb (2009)
 Circle of Friends (1995) 
 Clash of the Ash (1987)
 Closing the Ring (2007)
 The Colleen Bawn (1924)
 The Commitments (1991)
 The Country Girls (1984)
 The Courier (1988)
 Cowboys & Angels (2003)
 The Craic (1999)
 Cré na Cille (2007)
 A Christmas Star (2015)
 Cruiskeen Lawn (1922)
 Cry of the Innocent (1980)
 The Crying Game (1992)
 The Cured (2017)

D

 Da (1988)
 Dancing at Lughnasa (1998)
 Darby O'Gill and the Little People (1959)
 A Date for Mad Mary (2016)
 Daughter of Darkness (1948)
 The Dawn (1936) - also called Dawn Over Ireland
 The Dawning (1988)
 The Dead (1987)
 Dead Along the Way (2016)
 Dead Bodies (2003)
 Dead Man's Evidence (1962)
 Dead Meat (2004)
 Dear Sarah (1990)
 December Bride (1991)
 The Delinquent Season (2018)
 Dementia 13 (1963)
  (The Ireland Crime Mystery: The Dead of Glenmore Abbey) (2019)
 The Devil's Doorway (2018)
 The Dig (2018)
 The Disappearance of Finbar (1996)
 Disco Pigs (2001)
 Divorcing Jack (1998)
 Dorothy Mills (2008)
 Doughboys in Ireland (1943)
 Draíocht (1996)
 Dublin Oldschool (2018)
 Durango (1999)

E

 Eamon (2009)
 Eat the Peach (1986)
 The Early Bird (1936)
 The Eclipse (2009)
 Elephant (1989)
 The Eliminator (1997)
 Eliot & Me (2012)
 Eliza Lynch: Queen of Paraguay (2013)
 Ellie (2016)
 Ek Tha Tiger (2012) 
 Enchantment (1920)
 Er kann's nicht lassen (He can't stop doing it) (1962)
 The Eternal (1998)
 Evelyn (2003)
 Evil Breed: The Legend of Samhain (2003)
 An Everlasting Piece (2000)

F

 Faeries (1981)
 The Fantasist (1986)
 Far and Away (1992)
 Fatal Deviation (1998)
 The Field (1990)
 Fifty Dead Men Walking (2008)
 The Fighting O'Flynn (1949)
 A Fighting Man (2014)
 The Fighting Prince of Donegal (1966)
 A Film with Me in It (2008)
 Finian's Rainbow (1968)
 Five Minutes of Heaven (2009)
 Flick (2000)
 Flight of the Doves (1971)
 Float Like a Butterfly (2018)
 Fools of Fortune (1990)
 The Foreigner (2017)
 Four Days in July (1984)
 The Fox of Glenarvon (1940)
 The Foxes of Harrow (1947)
 Frank (2014)
 Frankie Starlight (1995) 
 Freeze Frame (2004)
 From the Dark (2014)
 The Front Line (2006)
 A Further Gesture (1997) - also called The Break

G

 Garage (2007)
 The General (1998)
 General John Regan (1921)
 General John Regan (1933)
 The Gentle Gunman (1952)
 Ghostwood (2006)
 A Girl from Mogadishu (2020)
 Girl with Green Eyes (1964)
 Giro City (1982)
 Glassland (2014)
 Gold (2014)
 Goldfish Memory (2003)
 Good Vibrations (2013)
 Gorgo (1961)
 Grabbers (2012)
 The Guarantee (2014)
 The Guard (2011)
 Guests of the Nation (1935)
 Guns in the Heather (1969) - also called The Secret of Boyne Castle and Spy-Busters

H

 H3 (2001)
 The Hallow (2015) - originally titled  The Woods
 Handsome Devil (2016)
 Hangman's House (1928)
 Halo Effect (2004)
 Happy Ever After (1954)
 Happy Ever Afters (2009)
 The Hardy Bucks Movie (2013)
 Haywire (2011)
 He (2012)
 Headrush (2003)
 Hear My Song (1992)
 Helen (2008)
 Hellboy II: The Golden Army (2008)
 Hennessy (1975)
 Hidden Agenda (1990)
 Hideaways (2011)
 High Boot Benny (1993)
 The High Command (1937)
 High Spirits (1988)
 The Hole in the Ground (2019)
 Holy Cross (2003)
 Holy Water (2009) also called Hard Times
 Home Is the Hero (1959)
 Honeymoon for One (2011)
 How About You (2007)
 How Harry Became a Tree (2001)
 How to Be Happy (2013)
 How to Cheat in the Leaving Certificate (1998)
 Hunger (2008)
 Hungry Hill (1947)

I

 I See a Dark Stranger (1946)
 I Was Happy Here (1966)
 I Went Down (1997)
 The Iguana with the Tongue of Fire (1971)
 Images (1972)
 In Fear (2013)
 In the Days of St Patrick (1920)
 In the Name of the Father (1993)
 The Informer (1929)
 The Informer (1935)
 The Informant (1997)
 The Innocent Lie (1916)
 The Inside (2012)
 Inside I'm Dancing (2004)
 Intermission (2003)
 Into the West (1992)
 Ireland a Nation (1914)
 Irish and Proud of It (1936)
 Irish Destiny (1926)
 Irish for Luck (1936)
 Irish Hearts (1934)
 The Irish Honeymoon (1911)
 The Irish in America (1915)
 Irish Jam (2006)
 Island of Terror (1966)
 Isolation (2005)

J

 Jacqueline (1956)
 Jimmy's Hall (2014)
 Johnny Was (2005)
 Jump (2012)
 Juno and the Paycock (1930)
 Joyce in June (1982)

K

 Kathleen Mavourneen (1937)
 The Key (1934)
 Killing Bono (2011)
 The Killing of a Sacred Deer (2017)
 Kings (2007)
 King of the Travellers (2012)
 Kisses (2008)
 Kissing Candice (2017)
 Knocknagow (1918)
 Korea (1996)

L

 The Lads (2018)
 Lamb (1985)
 Langrishe, Go Down (1978)
 The Last Leprechaun (1998)
 The Last of the High Kings (1996) - also called Summer Fling
 The Last September (1999)
 The Last Unicorn (1982)
 Laws of Attraction (2004)
 Leap Year (2010)
 Leapin' Leprechauns! (1995)
 Legend of the Bog (2009) - also called Assault of Darkness
 Leprechaun 2 (1994)
 Leprechaun: Origins (2014)
 Life's a Breeze (2013)
 Light Years Away (1981)
 Lily of Killarney (1929)
 Lily of Killarney (1934)
 Linen from Ireland (1939)
 Little Nellie Kelly (1940) 
 Little White Lie (2008)
 The Lobster (2015)
 The Lodgers (2017)
 The Lonely Passion of Judith Hearne (1987)
 The Long Good Friday (1980)
 The Lost City of Z (film) (2016)
 Love and Rage (1998)
 A Love Divided (1999)
 Love, Rosie (2014)
 The Luck of the Irish (1936)
 The Luck of the Irish (1948)
 The Luck of the Irish (2001)

M

 The Mackintosh Man (1973)
 Mad About Mambo (2000)
 The Magdalene Sisters (2002)
 Man About Dog (2004)
 Man of Aran (1934)
 Man Dancin' (2003)
 A Man of No Importance (1994)
 Mammal (2016)
 The Matchmaker (1997)
 Maeve (1981)
 Mapmaker (2001)
 The March Hare (1956 film) (1956)
 Maze (2017)
 The Medallion (2003)
 Men of Ireland (1938)
 Metal Heart (2018)
 The Mighty Celt (2005)
 Mission: Impossible – Fallout (2018)
 Moondance (1995)
 The Most Fertile Man in Ireland (1999)
 Mountains O'Mourne (1938)
 Michael Collins (1996)
 Michael Inside (2017)
 Mickybo and Me (2004)
 The Miracle (1991)
 Mrs. Brown's Boys D'Movie (2014)
 My Brother's War (1997)
 My Friend Joe (1995)
 My Hands Are Clay (1948)
 My Irish Molly (1938)
 My Left Foot (1989)
 My Life for Ireland (1941)
 My Name Is Emily (2015)

N

 Nails (2007)
 Naked Massacre (1976)
 The Naked Truth (1957)
 The Nephew (1998)
 Night Boat to Dublin (1946)
 Night People (2015)
 Night Train (1998)
 A Nightingale Falling (2014)
 No Resting Place (1951)
 Noble (2014)
 Nora (2000)
 Nothing Personal (1995)
 Nothing Personal (2009)
 November Afternoon (1996)

O

 Odd Man Out (1947)
 Oh, Mr. Porter! (1937)
 Omagh (2004)
 On a Paving Stone Mounted (1978)
 On the Edge (2001)
 On the Nose (2001)
 One Hundred Mornings (2009)
 Once (2006)
 Ondine (2010)
 Only Human (2010)
 Only the Wind (1961)
 Ordinary Decent Criminal (2000)
 The Oracle (1953)
 Ourselves Alone (1936)
 The Outsider (1980)

P

 Paddy the Next Best Thing (1923)
 Paddy the Next Best Thing (1933)
 Parked (2011)
 Parnell (1937) 
 Patrick's Day (2014)
 Patriots (1994)
 Patriot Games (1992)
 Pavee Lackeen (2005)
 Pay the Ghost (2015)
 Peacefire (2008)
 Peg o' My Heart (1933)
Penance (2018)
 Perrier's Bounty (2009)
 Pete's Meteor (2002)
 Philomena (2013)
 The Pier (2011)
 Pilgrimage (2017)
 Pixie (2020)
 The Playboy of the Western World (1962)
 The Playboys (1992)
 A Portrait of the Artist as a Young Man (1977)
 Plague Town (2008)
 The Plough and the Stars (1936)
 Poitín (1978)
 Professor Tim (1957)
 P.S. I Love You (2007)
 A Prayer for the Dying (1987)
 The Private Lives of Elizabeth and Essex (1939)
 Puckoon (2002)
 Puffball (2007)
 The Purple Taxi (1977)
 Pursuit (2015)

Q

 Quackser Fortune Has a Cousin in the Bronx (1970)
 The Quare Fellow (1962)
 A Quiet Day in Belfast (1974)
 The Quiet Man (1952)

R

 Rat (2000)
 Rawhead Rex (1986)
 Red Roses and Petrol (2003)
 Reefer and the Model (1988)
 Reflections (1984)
 Resurrection Man (1998)
 Rialto (2019)
 The Rising of the Moon (1957)
 Rooney (1958)
 Rose of Tralee (1937)
 Rosie (2018)
 Round Ireland with a Fridge (2010)
 Run & Jump (2013)
 Ryan's Daughter (1970)

S

 Saints and Sinners (1949)
 Saltwater (2000)
 Sanctuary (2016)
 Scream of the Banshee (2011)
 The Sea (2013)
 Sea Fever (2019)
 Secret of the Cave (2006)
 The Secret of Kells (2009)
 The Secret of Roan Inish (1994)
 Secret People (1952)
 The Secret Scripture (2016)
 Sensation (2010)
 The Seventh Stream (2001)
 Shadow Dancer (2012)
 The Shadow of a Gunman (1972)
 The Shadow of a Gunman (1995)
 Shake Hands with the Devil (1959)
 Shamus (1958)
 She Creature (2001) 
 Shergar (1999) 
 A Shine of Rainbows (2009)
 Shrooms (2007)
 The Siege of Sidney Street (1960)
 Silence (2012)
 Silent Grace (2004)
 Sing Street (2016)
 Sinners (2002)
 The Snapper (1993)
 Some Mother's Son (1996)
 Song for a Raggy Boy (2003)
 Song of the Sea (2014)
 Soulsmith (2017)
 Spectre (1996)
 Speed Dating (2007)
 Spellbreaker: Secret of the Leprechauns (1996)
 Spin The Bottle (2004)
 The Spirit of St. Louis (1957)
 Spring Meeting (1941)
 St. Patrick: The Irish Legend (2000)
 The Stag (2013)
 Standby (2014)
 Stan and Ollie (2018)
 Steamin' + Dreamin': The Grandmaster Cash Story (2009)
 Steamin' + Dreamin' 2: Cash Back (2011)
 Stella Days (2011)
 The Strangers Came (1949)
 Strength and Honour (2007)
 Studs (2006)
 Summer of the Flying Saucer (2008)
 Sunday (2002)
 Sweety Barrett (1998)

T

 Taffin (1988)
 Tara Road (2005)
 A Terrible Beauty (1960) - also called The Night Fighters
 This Is My Father (1998)
 This Is The Sea (1997)
 This Other Eden (1959)
 Titanic Town (1999)
 Three Wise Women (2010)
 Three Wishes for Jamie (1987)
 The Tiger's Tail (2006)
 Treasure Island (1938)
 The Treaty (1991)
 Tristan & Isolde (2006)
 Trojan Eddie (1996)
 Trouble with Sex (2005)

U

 Ulysses (1967)
 Untamed (1955)

V

 The Van (1996)
 Veronica Guerin (2003)
 A Very Unlucky Leprechaun (1998)
 The Vicar of Bray (1937)
 The Violent Enemy (1968)

W

 Waiting for Dublin (2007)
 Wake Wood (2011)
 Waking Ned (1998) - also called Waking Ned Devine; filmed on the Isle of Man
 War of the Buttons (1994)
 A War of Children (1972)
 Watermelon (2003)
 W.C. (2009)
 Wee Lady Betty (1917)
 What If (2013) - also called The F Word
 What Richard Did (2012)
 When Brendan Met Trudy (2001)
 When the Sky Falls (2000)
 White Pony (1999)
 Whole Lotta Sole (2012)
 Widows' Peak (1994)
 The Wind That Shakes the Barley (2006)
 Wild About Harry (2000)
 Wild Mountain Thyme (2020)
 Willy Reilly and his Colleen Bawn (1920)
 Winter's End (2005)  
 Words Upon the Window Pane (1994)

Y

 The Yank (2014)
 You Are Not My Mother (2021)
 You Can't Fool an Irishman (1949)
 Yesterday's Children (2000)
 You, Me & Marley (1992)
 Young Cassidy (1965)
 The Young Offenders (2016)

Z

 Zoetrope (2011)
 Zonad (2009)
 Zoo (2017)

Short films 

 All for Old Ireland (1915)
 An Ranger (The Ranger) (2008)
 Bold Emmett Ireland's Martyr (1915)
 The Boogeyman (2010)
 The Colleen Bawn (1911)
 Come Back to Erin (1914)
 Conway, the Kerry Dancer (1912)
 The Crush (2010)
 Dance Lexie Dance (1996)
 The Eye of the Government (1914)
 Far From Erin's Isle (1912)
 The Fishermaid of Ballydavid (1911)
 For Ireland's Sake (1914)
 His Mother (1912)
 History of Cinema (2008)
 Hostage (1984)
 The Hungry Grass (1981)
 I Dreamt I Woke Up (1991)
 Ireland, the Oppressed (1912)
 The Kerry Gow (1912)
 The Lad from Old Ireland (1910)
 The Lady Peggy's Escape (1913)
 The Long Way Home (1995)
 The Mayor From Ireland (1912)
 O'Neil of the Glen (1916)
 The O'Neill (1912)
 Oidhche Sheanchais (A Night of Storytelling) (1935)
 Paying the Rent (1920)
 Pretty Polly (1957)
 Return to Glennascaul (1951)
 Riders to the Sea (1935)
 Rory O'More (1911)
 Setanta - The Boy cú chulainn (1999)
 The Shaughraun (1912)
 The Vagabonds (1912)
 When Love Came To Gavin Burke (1917)
 The Wives of Jamestown (1913)
 You Remember Ellen (1912)
 Yu Ming Is Ainm Dom (2003)

Documentary films set in Ireland

Numbers

 1798 and After (1998) - Documentary with 5 episodes and produced by Channel 4
 1916: The Irish Rebellion (2016)
 The 34th (2018)
 50,000 Secret Journeys (1994)

A

 Above the Law (2015) - Documentary episode by RTÉ Investigation Unit and produced by RTÉ
 Achieving Freedom (2011) 
 The Age of De Valera (1982) - Documentary with 4 episodes
 An Conradh 1921 (The Treaty 1921) (2011) - Produced by TG4
 An Deichniúr Dearmadta (The Forgotten Ten) (2002) - Produced by TG4
 An Independent People (2013) - Documentary with 3 episodes and produced by BBC Northern Ireland
 Atlantean (2005) - Documentary with 4 episodes
 Atlantic (2016)

B

 Ballymun Lullaby (2011)
 The Ballymurphy Massacre (2012)
 The Ballymurphy Precedent (2018)
 Battle of the Bogside (2004)
 Behind the Mask (1991)
 Being AP (2015)
 Belfast: No Peace on the Streets (1993)
 Beneath a Dublin Sky (2006)
 Bertie (2008) - Documentary with 4 episodes
 Blazing the Trail: The O'Kalems in Ireland (2011)
 Blind Vision (2007)
 Blood Fruit (2014)
 Blood of the Irish (2009) - Documentary with 2 episodes 
 Bobby Sands: 66 Days (2016)
 The Boys of St Columb's (2009)
 Bomb Squad Men: The Long Walk (2012)
 Born and Reared (2016)
 Brigid's Night: La 'Le Bride (1961) - Documentary episode by Radharc and produced by the RTÉ
 A Bright Brand New Day (1982)
 Broken Song (2013)

C

 Cardinal Secrets (2002) - Documentary episode by Prime Time and produced by RTÉ
 Charles Haughey's Ireland (1986) - Produced by Pipeline for Channel 4
 The Charlton Years (1996)
 Children at Work (1973)
 Children in Crossfire (1974) 
 Children of the Revolution (2016) Produced by RTÉ
 Citizen Lane (2018)
 A City Dreaming (2014)
 Collins & De Valera: Heroes & Villains (2016)
 Collusion (2015) - Documentary episode by Panorama and produced by the BBC
 Cradle of Genius (1961)
 Croagh Patrick: Mass Rock & Men's Sodality (1962) - Documentary episode by Radharc and produced by the RTÉ
 Cromwell: Conquering the Emerald Isle 1641-1650  (2005) - Documentary episode for The Conquerors by History Channel
 Cromwell in Ireland (2008)
 The Crest (2017)
 Curious Journey (1974) - Banned until 1980
 Customs (2008) - Documentary with 6 episodes

D

 Dangerous Liaisons (2004) -  Documentary episode by Spotlight and produced by the BBC 
 The Day mountbatten Died (2019) - BBC Documentary
 Death on the Rock (1988) - Documentary episode by This Week and produced by Thames Television
 Dolores Keane: A Storm in the Heart (2014)
 Dirty Money: The Story of the Criminal Assets Bureau (2008) - Documentary with 6 episodes
 The Disappeared (2013)
 Discovery (1964)
 A Doctor's Sword (2015)
 Dreaming the Quiet Man (2010)
 The Dublin-Monaghan Bombings 1974 (1993) - Documentary episode by First Tuesday and produced by Yorkshire Television
 Dying for a Drink (1983) - Documentary episode by Radharc and produced by the RTÉ

E

 Éamon de Valera: Ireland's Hated Hero (1999) - Documentary episode by Reputations and produced by BBC
 Easter 1916: The Enemy Files (2016) - Documentary episode presented by Michael Portillo and co-produced by RTÉ and BBC 
 The Emerald Diamond (2006)

F

 Face-Off: De Valera v Churchill (2007) - Documentary episode by Hidden History and produced by RTÉ
 Family Fortune: De Valera and the Irish Press (2004) - Documentary episode by Hidden History and produced by RTÉ
 Famine to Freedom (2003) - Produced by Discovery Channel
 Fintona, A Study of Housing Discrimination (1953)
 The Forgotten Irish (2009) - Produced by TV3 Ireland
 The Franciscan Friars of Killarney (1911)
 Frederick Douglass and the White Negro (2008)
 Freefall (2010) - - Documentary with 2 episodes and produced by RTÉ
 Frongoch: Coláiste na Réabhlóide (Frongoch: University of Revolution) (2007) - Produced by TG4

G

 Gabriel Byrne: Stories from Home (2008)
 Get Collins: The Intelligence War in Dublin (2007)
 The Ghost of Roger Casement (2002)
 The Great Famine (1995) - BBC Documentary
 Green is the Colour (2012) - Produced by RTÉ
 Growing Up Gay (2010) - Documentary with 2 episodes

H

 Hands (1978-1989) - Documentary series with 37 episodes
 Hang Up Your Brightest Colours (1973) - Banned by Independent Broadcasting Authority  until 1993
 Harry Clarke – Darkness in Light (2003)
 Haughey (2005) - Documentary with 4 episodes
 Hawks and Doves: The Crown and Ireland's War of Independence. (2020) - also called The Enemy Files II - Documentary with 2 episodes presented by Michael Portillo and produced by Midas Productions for RTÉ, BBC and Oireachtas TV 
 The Hills of Ireland (1951)
 His & Hers (2009)
 Home Rule (1995) - Documentary with 5 episodes and produced by BBC Northern Ireland
 How to Defuse a Bomb: The Project Children Story (2016)
 How We Blew the Boom (2009) - Produced by RTÉ
 Hume (2011)  - Produced by BBC Northern Ireland
 The Hunger (2020)

I

 I Am Belfast (2015)
 I Dreamt I Woke Up (1991)
 If Lynch Had Invaded (2009) - RTÉ produced documentary
 Illegal Moneylending (1969) - Documentary episode by 7 Days and produced by RTÉ, documentary lead to a tribunal of inquiry
 In Search of the Pope's Children (2006) - Documentary with 3 episodes
 In Sunshine or in Shadow (2010)
 Ireland: 'The Emerald Isle' (1934)
 Ireland: A Television History (1980) - Multi-award-winning documentary by Robert Kee
 Ireland's Great Hunger and the Irish Diaspora (2016)
 Ireland's Greatest (2010)
 Ireland's Nazis (2007) - Documentary episode by Hidden History and produced by RTÉ
 Ireland's Pickpockets (2012)
 The Irish in America (1995) - Produced by History Channel
 The Irish Pub (2013)

J

 J.P. Dunleavy's Ireland: In All Her Sins and Graces (1992) - Produced by Discovery Channel
 Jack Charlton: The Irish Years (2005)
 James Joyce: 1882-1941 (2004) - Produced by The Biography Channel
 Jimmy's Winnin' Matches (2013)
 Joshua Greer’s Amazing Irish Adventure  (2012)

K

 The Killings at Coolacrease (2007) - Documentary episode by Hidden History and produced by RTÉ
 Knuckle (2011)

L

 Lethal Force (1990) - Documentary episode by Panorama and produced by the BBC
 A Little Bit TV (2012) - Documentary with 8 episodes
 The Longest Decade (1978) - Produced by Ulster Television
 Lost Lives (2019) - Produced by BBC Northern Ireland
 A Lost Son (2012) - Produced by RTÉ

M

 The Madness From Within (1998) - Documentary produced by RTÉ and later found to contain a number of distortions on facts from the Irish Civil War 
 The Making of 'The Quiet Man' (1992 
 Marooned (2004)
 Mary McAleese and the Man Who Saved Europe (2015)
 Massacre at Ballymurphy (2018) - Documentary episode by Dispatches and produced by Channel 4
 Mattress Men (2016)
 The Maze (2002)
 Men at Lunch (2012)
 Micko (2018)
 Mise Éire (1959)
 Mission to Prey (2011) - Documentary episode by Prime Time Investigates and produced by RTÉ - later found to have made multiple false allegations 
 More Than a Sacrifice (1995)
 A Mother Brings Her Son to Be Shot (2017)
 Mother Ireland (1991)
 Mountbatten: Death of a Royal (2013) - Produced by RTÉ

N

 Na Chéad Fight Clubs (The First Fight Clubs) (2010) - Produced by TG4
 Ná Lig Sinn i nDearmad (Lest We Be Forgotten) (2003) - Documentary episode by Léargas (Insight) and produced by RTÉ
 No Béarla (2007) - Documentary with 4 episodes
 Obama: the Road to Moneygall (2011)
 No Stone Unturned (2017)

O

 Ó Pheann an Phiarsaigh: The Writings of Patrick Pearse (2010) - Produced by TG4
 The O'Kalems Visit Killarney (1912)
 Oisín (1970)
 Old Scores (1983)
 Older Than Ireland (2015)
 One Million Dubliners (2014)
 Open Port (1968) - Documentary episode by Radharc and produced by the RTÉ

P

 P.H. Pearse: Fanatic Heart (2001) - Documentary episode by True Lives and produced by RTÉ
 Paddy The Cope: Templecrone Co-op (1962) - Documentary episode by Radharc and produced by the RTÉ
 Paisley: From Troublemaker to Peacemaker (2008) - Produced by RTÉ
 Patrick: The Renegade Saint (2012) - Produced by RTÉ
 The Patriot Game (2007) - Produced by TG4
 The Peacemaker (2016) 
 The Pipe (2010)
 Players of the Faithful (2018)
 The Pressure Cooker (2008)

Q

 The Queen of Ireland (2015)

R

 Reeling in the Years (1999 - 2010) - 48 episodes of archival footage on news events from the 1962 to 2010
 The Reluctant Taoiseach (2010) - Produced by RTÉ
 The Miami Showband Massacre (2019)  - Documentary episode by ReMastered and produced by Netflix
 Revolutions (2016)
 R I C: The Forgotten Force (2004) - Produced by RTÉ
 The Road to Nowhere (1971) - Documentary episode by Radharc and produced by the RTÉ
 Rocky Road to Dublin (1967)
 Roger Casement - Heart of Darkness (1992)
 Roll Up Your Sleeves (2008)
 Rough Rider (2014)

S

Salmon Run with Jack Charlton (1994)
 School Life (2016)
 Seaview (2007)
 Searching for Shergar (2018)
 See You at the Pillar (1967)
 Seven Ages (2000) - Documentary with seven episodes
 Sex & Sensibility (2008) - Documentary with 4 episodes
 Sex in a Cold Climate (1998)
 The Shame of the Catholic Church (2012) - Documentary episode by This World and produced by BBC 
 Shamrock and Swastika (2001)
 Skin in the Game (2012)
 Spotlight on the Troubles: A Secret History (2019) - Documentary with seven episodes & behind the scenes episode
 The Spy in the IRA (2017) - Documentary episode by Panorama and produced by BBC 
 A State Apart (1995) - Documentary with 5 episodes and produced by BBC Northern Ireland
 States of Fear (1999)
 The Story of Ireland (2011) Documentary with 5 episodes 
 Study Ireland (1990) - Documentary with 8 episodes and produced by BBC Northern Ireland
 Suffer Little Children (1994) – Documentary episode by Counterpoint and produced by UTV
 Sweepstakes (2003) - Documentary episode by Hidden History and produced by RTÉ

T

 Taoiseach (2009) - Documentary with 4 episodes and Produced by TV3 Ireland
 A Terrible Beauty... (2013) - Produced by RTÉ
 Theobald Wolfe Tone (????) - Documentary by Kenneth Griffith completed but not published .
 Til the Tenth Generation (2009)
 To Kill the Cabinet (1986)

U

 The Ulster Covenant (2012) - Produced by BBC Northern Ireland
 Ulster Unearthed (1997) - Documentary with 5 episodes and produced by UTV for Channel 4
 Unbreakable (2014)
 Unquiet Graves (2018)

W

 The Wall (2016)
 Waveriders (2008)
 Whatever You Say, Say Nothing (1995) -  Co-produced by ZDF & 3sat (German) in English language 
 When Ali Came to Ireland (2012)
 When Charlie Met Kitty (2011) - Documentary episode by Scannal (Scandal) and produced by RTÉ & TG4
 When Ireland Staved (1992) - Documentary with 4 episodes by Radharc and produced by the RTÉ
 Wild Ireland: The Edge of the World (2017) 
 Who Bombed Birmingham? (1991)

Y

 Yeats Country (1965)
 The Year London Blew Up: 1974 (2005) - Documentary produced by Channel 4
 Yes I Can (2011) - Documentary with 4 episodes
 Young Offender (1963) - Documentary episode by Radharc and produced by the RTÉ

Television mini-series set in Ireland

 Acceptable Risk (2017)
 Act of Betrayal (1988)
 Against the Wind (1978) - Irish and Australian settings
 An Crisis (The Crisis) (2010)
 Amber (2014)
 Amongst Women (1998) 
 The Bombmaker (2001)
 Captains & Kings (1976) - story of an Irish immigrant family)
 Caught in a Free State (1983)
 Charlie (2015)
 Civvies (1992)
 Confessional (1989)
 Dan & Becs (2007)
 Deception (2013)
 Dublin Murders (2019)
 Eureka Street (1999)
 Falling for a Dancer (1998) 
 Fallout (2006)
 Family (1994)
 Father & Son (2009)
 Finding Joy (2018)
 Foreign Exchange (2004)
 The Hanging Gale  (1995)
 Harry's Game (1982)
 Insurrection (1966)
 Kat & Alfie: Redwater (2017)
 Kings in Grass Castles (1998)
 Legend (2006)
 Love is the Drug (2004)
 The Magical Legend of the Leprechauns (1999)
 Mia, Liebe meines Lebens (Mia, Love of My Life) (1998)
 Murder in Eden (1991)
 Painted Lady (1997)
 Parnell and the Englishwoman (1991)
 Paths to Freedom (2000)
 Paula (2017) 
 Proof (2004)
 Prosperity (2007)
 Pure Mule (2005)
 Quirke (2014)
 Random Passage (2002)
 Rebel Heart (2001)
 Rebellion (2016)
 Resistance (2019)
 Scarlett (1994) - sequel to Gone with the Wind
 Shoot to Kill (1990)
 Stardust (2006)
 The Secret (2016)
 Strumpet City (1980)
 Taken Down (2018)
 The Virtues (2019)
 Whistleblower (2008)
 Wild Decembers (2010)
 The Year of the French (1982)

List of films shot in Ireland

This list covers films shot, or partly shot, in Ireland, but which are not set there.

Henry V (1944)
Moby Dick (1956) - filmed in Youghal, County Cork
The Siege of Sidney Street (1960)
The Spy Who Came In From The Cold (1965) - Berlin Wall and Checkpoint Charlie scenes were filmed at Smithfield, Dublin
The Blue Max (1966) - set in WWI France
The Italian Job (1969) - jail scenes filmed in Kilmainham Jail; funeral scene at Cruagh Cemetery, near Rockbrook in the foothills of the Wicklow Mountains
Sinful Davey (1969)
Sitting target (1972) - Kilmainham Jail
The Mackintosh Man (1973) - includes scenes shot at Roundstone, County Galway
Zardoz (1974)
The Last Remake of Beau Geste (1977)
The First Great Train Robbery (1978)
McVicar (1980) -  Mountjoy Prison
Excalibur (1981) - entire movie shot in Ireland, including a scene at Powerscourt Waterfall
Educating Rita (1983) - set in Liverpool; university scenes shot in Dublin's Trinity College
 The Princess Bride (1987) - the Cliffs of Insanity scenes filmed at the Cliffs of Moher, County Clare
Braveheart (1995) - set in Scotland but almost entirely filmed in Ireland; Trim Castle used as Carlisle
Moll Flanders (1996)
Saving Private Ryan (1998) - beach scenes filmed on Curracloe beach, County Wexford
David Copperfield (2000)
Reign of Fire (2002) - entire movie, includes scenes shot at Wicklow Gap and Poolbeg Generating Station
 Ella Enchanted (2004)
King Arthur (2004)
Freeze Frame (2004)
Sachein (2005) - Tamil film; a song was shot in Ireland
The League Of Gentlemen's Apocalypse (2005) - almost entirely filmed in Northern Ireland
Harry Potter and the Half-Blood Prince (2009) - filmed at the Cliffs of Moher
Ek Tha Tiger (2012) - Bollywood movie; a song was shot in Dublin's Trinity College
 Star Wars: The Force Awakens (2015) - Skellig Michael County Kerry
A Dark Song (2016) - Horror Film set mostly in Wales but shot in Ireland
 Star Wars: The Last Jedi (2017)
 Star Wars: The Rise of Skywalker (2019) - Cliffs of Moher Death star wreckage scenes

See also
 Cinema of Ireland
 :Category:Films shot in Ireland
 Cinema of Northern Ireland
 List of films set in Northern Ireland
 List of movies based on location
 List of Irish films

References

Ireland